Laguna Coast Wilderness Park is a  wilderness area in the San Joaquin Hills surrounding Laguna Beach, California. This park features coastal canyons, ridgeline views and the only natural lakes in Orange County, California. Trails are maintained for hiking and mountain biking with a wide range of difficulty, from beginner to expert. Several trails lead to downtown Laguna Beach.

Laguna Coast Wilderness Park has some of the last remaining undeveloped coastal canyons in Southern California. The park is dominated by coastal sage scrub, cactus and native grasses. Over 40 endangered and sensitive species call Laguna Coast home including California gnatcatcher, cactus wren and the endemic Dudleya stolonifera. Both Laguna Coast, Aliso and Wood Canyons Wilderness Park are also home to mule deer, long-tailed weasel, healthy bobcat populations, and raptors like red-tailed hawk and the ground-nesting northern harrier.

South Coast Wilderness

Laguna Coast Wilderness Park is part of the contiguous approximately  South Coast Wilderness area in southern Orange County, California. It stretches from Newport Beach to Laguna Niguel, and from Irvine to the Pacific Ocean.

The genesis of this designated wilderness area occurred in 1960 when bookstore owner James Dilley began advocating for a Laguna Beach greenbelt. Dilley's dream ultimately required the commitment of thousands of people, more than $65 million and decades to complete.

In 1990, inspired by a quartet of Laguna-based non-profits and by Laguna Beach, Irvine and Laguna Woods, the County of Orange, the State of California and the Irvine Company, voters approved a $20 million bond to purchase Laguna Canyon, to prevent development there and to keep it as an open space green belt forever.

Today, the South Coast Wilderness area offers visitors access to Orange County’s only natural lakes, a thriving wildlife community, nature centers, interpretive programs, and recreational activities, from hiking and birding to mountain biking.

The South Coast Wilderness open space includes:
 Laguna Coast Wilderness Park. 
 Aliso and Wood Canyons Wilderness Park, a  park of coastal canyon wilderness in Laguna Niguel, California.
 Crystal Cove State Park, a  National Natural Landmark of backcountry, wilderness, coastal bluffs, beaches and tide pools. National Register Historic District. 
 City of Irvine Open Space Preserve, a  preserve, featuring coastal sage scrub, oak, woodland, grassland and riparian communities. 
 City of Newport Beach Open Space, a  area open for docent-led hiking and biking. 
 City of Laguna Woods,  of open space.

Laguna Greenbelt

Laguna Greenbelt, Inc. is a grassroots organization, founded in 1968 to preserve and protect the environment in and around Laguna Beach and Orange County. This non-profit works for the benefit of the general public informing, advocating and educating concerned citizens. With James Dilley as its founder, Laguna Greenbelt secures open space for the residents of Orange County and beyond. The Greenbelt believes, "that open space and wilderness areas along with wildlife habitat preservation are critical to the long-term health and well being of residents of southern California…We fought to preserve Laguna Canyon, Aliso and Woods Canyons and, the large swath of coastal hills known as the San Joaquin Hills. Much of our history has revolved around informing citizens, decision makers and stakeholders about the many benefits of open space preservation and protection…This work continues today with our initiative on the Irvine Regional Wildlife Corridor, an important wildlife habitat connection between the Laguna Greenbelt/South Coast Wilderness area and the Cleveland National Forest." Laguna Greenbelt also helped facilitate the formation of the Laguna Canyon Foundation.

Laguna Canyon Foundation

Following the historic environmental events of 1989, including the creation of The Tell photographic mural, as part of the Laguna Canyon Project, and the subsequent "Walk to Save Laguna Canyon" that culminated at this outdoor public installation, a bond measure was passed in 1990 by Laguna Beach voters; after which the Laguna Canyon Foundation was formed to manage preservation of Laguna Canyon. The Canyon Foundation soon facilitated the purchase of additional sections of open space that had been slated for development, and in 1993, established Laguna Coast Wilderness Park. In 2014, Laguna native Hallie Jones was named executive director of the Laguna Canyon Foundation.

Today, more than 200 Laguna Canyon Foundation volunteers help Orange County Parks manage these very special coastal canyons. The James and Rosemary Nix Nature Center on Laguna Canyon Road in the Wilderness Park contributes to this effort by featuring exhibits, educational programs, guided hikes and other activities. In 2015, it was featured, along with other organizations, in Laguna Beach Eco Heroes, a 30-minute documentary by The My Hero Project. The efforts of the Crystal Cove Alliance, ECO-Warrior Foundation|ECO Warrior, Laguna Bluebelt, Nancy Caruso, One World One Ocean, Pacific Marine Mammal Center, Wyland, and Zero Trash Laguna were also highlighted in the documentary.

References

External links
 Orange County Parks/Laguna Coast
 Laguna Canyon Foundation
 Laguna Greenbelt
 Laguna Wilderness Press
 OC Parks:  Aliso and Wood Canyons Wilderness Park
 Crystal Cove State Park 
 City of Irvine Open Space Preserve

Parks in Orange County, California
Regional parks in California
San Joaquin Hills